Electric Power Systems Research is a peer-reviewed scientific journal covering research on new applications of transmission, generation, distribution and uses of electric power. Its current editor-in-chief is Maria Teresa Correia de Barros. According to the Journal Citation Reports, the journal has a 2010 impact factor of 1.396.

References

External links 
 

Power engineering
Electric power
Elsevier academic journals
Electrical and electronic engineering journals
Publications established in 1977
Monthly journals
English-language journals